The Wayside Inn located on Louisiana Highway 154 near Gibsland, Louisiana was built in 1857.  It was listed on the National Register of Historic Places in 1980.

It is a five-bay residence with the only pedimented entrance portico in the community.  It was built by Reverend Jesse Hartwell, who was president of Mt. Lebanon University from 1858 to 1859.

References

See also
National Register of Historic Places listings in Bienville Parish, Louisiana

National Register of Historic Places in Louisiana
Greek Revival architecture in Louisiana
Commercial buildings completed in 1857
Bienville Parish, Louisiana